Vovchukhy is a village (selo) in Lviv Raion, Lviv Oblast (province) of Ukraine. It belongs to Horodok urban hromada, one of the hromadas of Ukraine. 
The population of the village is just about 747 people.

Geography 
The village is surrounded by Dobrjany, Dolyniany, Rodatychi and Bratkovychi. Near the village passes railway from Lviv to Przemyśl in Poland.

History and Attractions 
The village was founded in 1428.

Until 18 July 2020, Vovchukhy belonged to Horodok Raion. The raion was abolished in July 2020 as part of the administrative reform of Ukraine, which reduced the number of raions of Lviv Oblast to seven. The area of Horodok Raion was merged into Lviv Raion.

The village has attractions of monumental art of Horodok Raion – a monument to Ivan Franko, and the priest Zahayevych. In the village there is a monument to Taras Shevchenko, a monument to Ukrainian Sich Riflemen.

Personalities 
 Zahayevych Vasyl Dmytrovych – Ukrainian writer, educator. The priest of the Greek Catholic Church, the pastor of the village Vovchukhy. A close associate of Ivan Franko.

References

External links 
 weather.in.ua

Villages in Lviv Raion